Oriental College of Pharmacy (OCP) is located in Sanpada, Navi Mumbai founded by the Oriental Education Society.

The Oriental College of Pharmacy was established in 2004 and recognised by All India Council for Technical Education (A.I.C.T.E.), New Delhi and it is affiliated to the University of Mumbai.
Besides the regular curriculum, the students are also involved in co-curricular activities like Live projects, summer internships, Inter college competitions, Research projects etc.

Principal: Dr. Sudha Rathod

Courses
OCP offers full-time Graduate and Post graduate programs affiliated to University of Mumbai.

 B. Pharm (Bachelor in Pharmacy):
B. Pharm (Bachelor in Pharmacy) is a Four year full time graduate degree course in Pharmacy.

M. Pharm (Masters in Pharmacy):
Pharmaceutics
Quality Assurance
Pharmcognosy
Pharmacology

Admission
The admission procedure to the institute is through scores from MH-CET (Common Entrance Test) conducted by the Directorate of Technical Education, Maharashtra state.

Pharmacy colleges in Maharashtra
Universities and colleges in Mumbai
Affiliates of the University of Mumbai
Education in Navi Mumbai
Educational institutions established in 2004
2004 establishments in Maharashtra